A workprint is a rough version of a motion picture, used by the film editor(s) during the editing process. Such copies generally contain original recorded sound that will later be re-dubbed, stock footage as placeholders for missing shots or special effects, and animation tests for in-production animated shots or sequences.

For most of the first century of filmmaking, workprints were done using second-generation prints from the original camera negatives. After the editor and director approved of the final edit of the workprint, the same edits were made to the negative. With the conversion to digital editing, workprints are now generally created on a non-linear editing system using telecined footage from the original film or video sources (in contrast to a pirate "telecine", which is made with a much higher-generation film print). Occasionally, early digital workprints of films have been bootlegged and made available on the Internet. They sometimes appear months in advance of an official release.

There are also director's cut versions of films that are only available on bootleg, such as the workprint version of Richard Williams' The Thief and the Cobbler. Although movie studios generally do not make full-length workprints readily available to the public, there are exceptions. Examples include the "Work-In-Progress" version of Beauty and the Beast (albeit it's just unfinished footage intertwined with the DVD release on top with the finalized sound mix), and the Denver/Dallas pre-release version of Blade Runner. Deleted scenes or bonus footage included on DVD releases are sometimes left in workprint format as well, e.g. the Scrubs DVD extras. A workprint as source for a leaked television show is rather unusual, but it happened with the third season's first episode of Homeland a month before it aired.

Notable examples on the internet

 Hulk – Appeared on the internet two weeks before the film opening.
 Star Wars Episode III: Revenge of the Sith – Appeared on the web around the release. 
 The Simpsons episode "Steal This Episode" referenced this event in file-sharing history.
 X-Men Origins: Wolverine – Available on the internet before the premiere.
 Apocalypse Now – A 289-minute-long workprint circulates amongst collectors on the internet.
 This Is Spinal Tap – A 270-minute-long workprint exists on the internet (three times the final film's length).
 Vampires Suck – Appeared on the internet around a month prior to the film's theatrical release.
 Grizzly II: The Predator – This 1984 film, featuring early appearances by George Clooney, Charlie Sheen and Laura Dern, only existed as a bootleg workprint uploaded to YouTube for many years. The film was eventually officially released in 2021.
 Homeland – "Tin Man Is Down", the first episode of the third season leaked a month before airing. It being an unfinished version is rather unusual for a TV show.
 Doctor Who – Workprints of the first five episodes of series 8 were leaked online months in advance of their premieres. These versions were in black and white, were watermarked, and lacked the computer-generated effects seen in the final releases. Producer Steven Moffat publicly condemned the leaks, and urged fans to avoid watching the leaked episodes until they properly aired on TV.

References

Further reading
 

Film and video technology
Warez
Video
Copyright infringement
Film editing